Banksia squarrosa, commonly known as pingle, is a species of prickly shrub that is endemic to Western Australia. It has linear to narrow lance-shaped leaves with up to ten sharply-pointed teeth on each side, yellow flowers in heads of about sixty and later, up to seven oblong to egg-shaped follicles in each head.

Description
Banksia squarrosa is a shrub that typically grows to a height of  but does not form a lignotuber. Up to seven follicles form in each head.

Taxonomy and naming
This species was first collected from near King George Sound in 1829 by William Baxter, and its description was published by Robert Brown in Supplementum primum Prodromi florae Novae Hollandiae as Dryandra squarrosa the following year. 

In 1839 John Lindley described D. carduacea from specimens collected in the vicinity of the Swan River. In 1996, Alex George reduced D. carduacea to a synonym of D. squarrosa.

In 1996, George described two subspecies of D. squarrosa:

In 2007 Austin Mast and Kevin Thiele transferred all dryandras to the genus Banksia and renamed this species Banksia squarrosa and the two subspecies argillacea and squarrosa respectively. The names of the subspecies are accepted by the Australian Plant Census.

Distribution and habitat
Pingle is widely distributed in the south-west of Western Australia, occurring between Bindoon, the Whicher Range and Albany, growing in woodland and forest. Subspecies argillacea has a limited distribution near the western side of the Whicher Range. Subspecies squarrosa occurs throughout the species' range, except near the Whicher Range.

Conservation status
This banksia is classified as "not threatened" by the Western Australian Government Department of Parks and Wildlife, but subspecies argillacea is listed as "Threatened Flora (Declared Rare Flora — Extant)" by the Department of Environment and Conservation (Western Australia)

References

 

squarrosa
Taxa named by Robert Brown (botanist, born 1773)
Plants described in 1830